Dominic Antonucci is a ballet master and ex-principal dancer with the Birmingham Royal Ballet (BRB). He was raised in Akron, Ohio, having been born in nearby Athens. He first attended the Nan Klinger School of Dance from age eight and subsequently the School of American Ballet in New York City. Dominic joined American Ballet Theatre in 1991 and BRB in 1994 as a soloist, where he was promoted to principal in 2003.
He was appointed Ballet Master in 2009.

Roles

George Balanchine 

The Four Temperaments Theme 2
Orpheus Dark Angel
Slaughter on Tenth Avenue The Gangster
Serenade
Western Symphony

Frederick Ashton 

La Fille mal gardée Colas and Thomas
Enigma Variations Troyte Griffith
Façade Dago
The Two Pigeons Gypsy Lover
Dante Sonata
Scènes de ballet
Symphonic Variations

David Bintley 

Arthur Kay, White Dragon, Uriens, Gawain and Uther Pendragon
Beauty and the Beast Beast
Carmina Burana Third Seminarian
Edward II Mortimer
Far from the Madding Crowd Oak
Hobson's Choice Fred Beenstock
Salvation Army
The Nutcracker Sweeties Floreador
The Orpheus Suite Aristaeus, Apollo
The Shakespeare Suite Petruchio
The Sons of Horus Duamutef
'Still Life' at the Penguin Cafe Brazilian Woolly Monkey
Giselle Peasant pas de deux and Hilarion (David Bintley and Galina Samsova's production)

John Cranko 

Brouillards "Feuilles mortes" and "Des Pas sur la neige"
The Lady and the Fool Midas
Pineapple Poll Captain Belaye

Kenneth MacMillan 

Romeo and Juliet Romeo, Benvolio and Paris
Elite Syncopations "Bethena Concert Waltz"
Solitaire

Hans van Manen 

Five Tangos
Grosse Fuge

Nahid Siddiqui 

Krishna title role

Ninette de Valois 

Checkmate Second Red Knight

Peter Wright Productions 

Coppélia Franz
The Nutcracker Prince and Drosselmeyer
The Sleeping Beauty Bluebird
Swan Lake Siegfried and Benno (Peter Wright and Galina Samsova's production)

Awards 

 Finalist, Jackson International Ballet Competition, 1994

References

External links 
BRB Bio
Ballet.com Magazine Bio
NY Times Review by Jack Anderson, October 14, 1990
Telegraph Review by Mark Monahan, May 10, 2007

Living people
1974 births
American male ballet dancers
American Ballet Theatre dancers
Birmingham Royal Ballet principal dancers
Artists from Akron, Ohio
School of American Ballet alumni